Mirjam de Koning (born Peper) (born 16 July 1969 in Amsterdam) is a Dutch paraplegic swimmer.

De Koning was born with damaged connective tissue. After her daughter Sarina was born in 1993, she had seven anterior cruciate ligament surgeries. In 1999 she suffered from a hernia and during a back-surgery and a nerve was damaged. This left her with a form of paraplegia, hence she competes in the S6 classification. Swimming and wheelchair basketball were her sports, but as wheelchair basketball caused a lot of injuries, she decided to mainly focus on swimming. She started to train five times a week with local swim team called Oceanus in Aalsmeer. Not much later she was one of the fastest swimmers at her club, being able to keep up with swimmers without a disability. That year she swam seven Dutch national records in both 25 and 50 metres pools.

In 2005, she was ready to take part in the Dutch national championships, but to participate she had to be a member of the national swimming association. Just a few days before the start she became a member and she won four gold medals, breaking all four Dutch national records as well as a European record. The national records were in the 50 m freestyle, 50 m butterfly and at the 100 m freestyle. The European record and thus fourth Dutch record she swam at the 50m backstroke. De Koning broke her first World Record at the Open Danish swimming championships in Esbjerg, March 2006. She won seven medals at the Championships, of which four golds, one silver and two bronze as well as a new World Record at the 50m backstroke in a time of 45.46 seconds. She also broke another four Dutch national records. She then qualified for the 2006 World Championships in Durban, South Africa and she won two bronze medals. At the 100 m freestyle she swam a time of 1:22.50 and at the 100m backstroke she came to a time of 1:35.26 to take her second bronze. A few days later she became World Champion at the 50m freestyle after winning her race in 37.67 seconds to take her third medal of the Championships. At the 400m freestyle she finished in fourth place.

She represented the Netherlands at the 2008 Summer Paralympics in Beijing for a total of four events. At her first event, the 100m freestyle she won her first round heat in a time of 1:18.56, which was by far the best time of all finalists, with Eleanor Simmonds with 1:21.86 coming in second place. In the final Simmonds managed to improve her time to 1:18.75 while De Koning was only able to swim January 19, 2029 and take the silver, finishing still in front of Paralympic and World Record holder Doramitzi Gonzalez. Later in the week she beat Simmonds in the 50 m freestyle and came second behind Simmonds in the 400 freestyle. She also won a gold medal in the 100 m backstroke event.

Personal best times

See also
List of IPC world records in swimming
List of Paralympic records in swimming
Netherlands at the 2008 Summer Paralympics
Swimming at the 2008 Summer Paralympics

References

External links 
 

1969 births
Living people
Dutch female freestyle swimmers
Paralympic swimmers of the Netherlands
Swimmers at the 2008 Summer Paralympics
Swimmers at the 2012 Summer Paralympics
Paralympic gold medalists for the Netherlands
Paralympic silver medalists for the Netherlands
Paralympic bronze medalists for the Netherlands
Swimmers from Amsterdam
World record holders in paralympic swimming
Medalists at the 2008 Summer Paralympics
Medalists at the 2012 Summer Paralympics
S6-classified Paralympic swimmers
Medalists at the World Para Swimming Championships
Paralympic medalists in swimming
Dutch female backstroke swimmers
21st-century Dutch women